The 2013 Candidates Tournament was an eight-player chess double round-robin tournament that took place in the Institution of Engineering and Technology, Savoy Place, London, from 15 March to 1 April 2013. 

This was the first time in 51 years that the round-robin format had been used for a Candidates, though it had been used for the 2005 (FIDE) and 2007 world championships.

Participants
The participants were:

Prize fund
The tournament had a prize fund of €510,000 ($691,101). Prize money was shared between players tied on points; tiebreaks were not used to allocate it. The prizes for each place were as follows:

Summary
Before the tournament Carlsen was considered the favourite, with Kramnik and Aronian being deemed his biggest rivals. Ivanchuk was considered an uncertain variable, due to his instability, and the other players were considered less likely to win the event.

During the first half of the tournament, Aronian and Carlsen were considered the main contestants for first place. At the halfway point they were tied for first, one-and-a-half points ahead of Kramnik and Svidler. In the second half Kramnik, who had drawn his first seven games, became a serious contender after scoring four wins, while Aronian lost three games, and was thus left behind in the race. Carlsen started the second half by staying ahead of the field, but a loss to Ivanchuk allowed Kramnik to take the lead in round 12 by defeating Aronian. In the penultimate round Carlsen pulled level with Kramnik by defeating Radjabov, while Kramnik drew against Gelfand.

Before the last round only Carlsen and Kramnik could win the tournament; they were equal on 8½ points, 1½ points ahead of Svidler and Aronian. Carlsen had the better tie break (on the first tie break the score from their individual games was 1–1, but Carlsen was ahead on the second tie break due to having more wins), and this would not change if they both scored the same in the final round. Therefore, Kramnik, who had black against Ivanchuk, needed to outperform Carlsen, who had white against Svidler. Carlsen played to win, since that would guarantee him the tournament victory regardless of Kramnik's result; similarly, Kramnik knew that the odds of Carlsen losing with white were minute, and he went all-in against Ivanchuk with the Pirc defense. This backfired and Ivanchuk obtained an early advantage, while Carlsen got a level position against Svidler. Carlsen later got into serious time trouble and did not defend adequately against Svidler's attack, which gave Svidler a winning endgame. Meanwhile, Ivanchuk had outplayed Kramnik, who resigned a few minutes after Carlsen lost. Thus the tournament was won by Carlsen on the second tiebreak. Carlsen's win earned him the right to challenge the reigning world champion, Viswanathan Anand, for the world title.

Standings
{| class="wikitable"
|+ Final standings of the 2013 Candidates Tournament
|-
!rowspan="2"|Rank!!rowspan="2"|Player !!rowspan="2"|RatingMarch 2013 
!colspan="2" rowspan="2"|CAR
!colspan="2" rowspan="2"|KRA
!colspan="2" rowspan="2"|SVI
!colspan="2" rowspan="2"|ARO
!colspan="2" rowspan="2"|GEL
!colspan="2" rowspan="2"|GRI
!colspan="2" rowspan="2"|IVA
!colspan="2" rowspan="2"|RAD
!rowspan="2"|Points !! colspan=2|Tiebreaks
|-
!  !! Wins
|-
|- align="center" style="background:white; color:black"
|style="background:#ccffcc;"|1||align="left" style="background:#ccffcc;"|
|style="background:#ccffcc;"|2872
|style="background:lightgray" colspan="2"| 
|½||style="background:black; color:white"|½
|0||style="background:black; color:white"|1
|½||style="background:black; color:white"|½
|1||style="background:black; color:white"|1
|1||style="background:black; color:white"|½
|0||style="background:black; color:white"|½
|½||style="background:black; color:white"|1
|style="background:#ccffcc;"|8½|| style="background:#ccffcc;"|1 || style="background:#ccffcc;"|5
|- align="center" style="background:white; color:black"
|2||align="left"|
|2810
|½||style="background:black; color:white"|½
|style="background:lightgray" colspan="2"| 
|1||style="background:black; color:white"|½
|½||style="background:black; color:white"|1
|½||style="background:black; color:white"|½
|½||style="background:black; color:white"|1
|½||style="background:black; color:white"|0
|1||style="background:black; color:white"|½
|8½||1||4
|- align="center" style="background:white; color:black"
|3||align="left"|
|2747
|0||style="background:black; color:white"|1
|½||style="background:black; color:white"|0
|style="background:lightgray" colspan="2"| 
|1||style="background:black; color:white"|½
|½||style="background:black; color:white"|½
|½||style="background:black; color:white"|½
|1||style="background:black; color:white"|½
|1||style="background:black; color:white"|½
|8||1½||4
|- align="center" style="background:white; color:black"
|4||align="left"|
|2809
|½||style="background:black; color:white"|½
|0||style="background:black; color:white"|½
|½||style="background:black; color:white"|0
|style="background:lightgray" colspan="2"| 
|1||style="background:black; color:white"|0
|½||style="background:black; color:white"|½
|1||style="background:black; color:white"|1
|1||style="background:black; color:white"|1
|8||½||5
|- align="center" style="background:white; color:black"
|5||align="left"|
|2740
|0||style="background:black; color:white"|0
|½||style="background:black; color:white"|½
|½||style="background:black; color:white"|½
|1||style="background:black; color:white"|0
|style="background:lightgray" colspan="2"| 
|½||style="background:black; color:white"|½
|½||style="background:black; color:white"|½
|½||style="background:black; color:white"|1
|6½||1||2
|- align="center" style="background:white; color:black"
|6||align="left"|
|2764
|½||style="background:black; color:white"|0
|0||style="background:black; color:white"|½
|½||style="background:black; color:white"|½
|½||style="background:black; color:white"|½
|½||style="background:black; color:white"|½
|style="background:lightgray" colspan="2"| 
|1||style="background:black; color:white"|½
|½||style="background:black; color:white"|½
|6½||1||1
|- align="center" style="background:white; color:black"
|7||align="left"|
|2757
|½||style="background:black; color:white"|1
|1||style="background:black; color:white"|½
|½||style="background:black; color:white"|0
|0||style="background:black; color:white"|0
|½||style="background:black; color:white"|½
|½||style="background:black; color:white"|0
|style="background:lightgray" colspan="2"| 
|1||style="background:black; color:white"|0
|6||— ||3
|- align="center" style="background:white; color:black"
|8||align="left"|
|2793
|0||style="background:black; color:white"|½
|½||style="background:black; color:white"|0
|½||style="background:black; color:white"|0
|0||style="background:black; color:white"|0
|0||style="background:black; color:white"|½
|½||style="background:black; color:white"|½
|1||style="background:black; color:white"|0
|style="background:lightgray" colspan="2"|
|4||— ||1
|}

Results by round
Pairings and results. First named player is white. 1–0 indicates a white win, 0–1 indicates a black win, and ½–½ indicates a draw. Numbers in parentheses indicate players' scores prior to the round.
    

{| class="wikitable" style="font-size: 95%"
|-
|colspan=4 style="background:#cccccc;" | Round 1 – 15 March 2013
|-
|Levon Aronian            || Magnus Carlsen           ||align=center | ½–½ || E11 Bogo-Indian
|-
|Boris Gelfand            || Teimour Radjabov         ||align=center | ½–½ || E11 Bogo-Indian
|-
|Vasyl Ivanchuk         || Alexander Grischuk       ||align=center | ½–½ || E06 Catalan, Closed
|-
|Peter Svidler            || Vladimir Kramnik         ||align=center | ½–½ || D35 Queen's Gambit Declined
|-
|colspan=4 style="background:#cccccc;"| Round 2 – 16 March 2013
|-
|Magnus Carlsen (½)     || Vladimir Kramnik (½)   ||align=center | ½–½ || A33 English, Symmetrical
|-
|Alexander Grischuk (½) || Peter Svidler (½)      ||align=center | ½–½ || C84 Ruy Lopez
|-
|Teimour Radjabov (½)   || Vasyl Ivanchuk (½)   ||align=center | 1–0 || A88 Dutch, Leningrad
|-
|Levon Aronian (½)      || Boris Gelfand (½)      ||align=center | 1–0 || A04 Réti Opening
|-
|colspan=4 style="background:#cccccc;"| Round 3 – 17 March 2013
|-
|Boris Gelfand (½)      || Magnus Carlsen (1)       ||align=center | 0–1 || D52 Queen's Gambit Declined
|-
|Vasyl Ivanchuk (½)   || Levon Aronian (1½)      ||align=center | 0–1 || A45 Trompowsky Attack
|-
|Peter Svidler (1)        || Teimour Radjabov (1½)   ||align=center | 1–0 || E81 King's Indian, Sämisch
|-
|Vladimir Kramnik (1)     || Alexander Grischuk (1)   ||align=center | ½–½ || D71 Neo-Grünfeld
|-
|colspan=4 style="background:#cccccc;"| Round 4 – 19 March 2013
|-
|Magnus Carlsen (2)       || Alexander Grischuk (1½) ||align=center | 1–0 || C65 Ruy Lopez
|-
|Teimour Radjabov (1½)   || Vladimir Kramnik (1½)   ||align=center | ½–½ || E54 Nimzo-Indian, 4. e3
|-
|Levon Aronian (2½)      || Peter Svidler (2)        ||align=center | ½–½ || D22 Queen's Gambit Accepted
|-
|Boris Gelfand (½)      || Vasyl Ivanchuk (½)   ||align=center | ½–½ || D07 Chigorin Defense
|-
|colspan=4 style="background:#cccccc;"| Round 5 – 20 March 2013
|-
|Vasyl Ivanchuk (1)     || Magnus Carlsen (3)       ||align=center | ½–½ || D93 Grünfeld, Bf4 & e3
|-
|Peter Svidler (2½)      || Boris Gelfand (1)        ||align=center | ½–½ || D85 Grünfeld, Exchange
|-
|Vladimir Kramnik (2)     || Levon Aronian (3)        ||align=center | ½–½ || A07 King's Indian Attack
|-
|Alexander Grischuk (1½) || Teimour Radjabov (2)     ||align=center | ½–½ || D35 Queen's Gambit Declined
|-
|colspan=4 style="background:#cccccc;"| Round 6 – 21 March 2013
|-
|Peter Svidler (3)        || Magnus Carlsen (3½)     ||align=center | 0–1 || C84 Ruy Lopez, Closed
|-
|Vladimir Kramnik (2½)   || Vasyl Ivanchuk (1½)   ||align=center | ½–½ || E00 Queen's Pawn Game
|-
|Alexander Grischuk (2)   || Boris Gelfand (1½)      ||align=center | ½–½ || B30 Sicilian, Rossolimo
|-
|Teimour Radjabov (2½)   || Levon Aronian (3½)      ||align=center | 0–1 || C65 Ruy Lopez
|-
|colspan=4 style="background:#cccccc;"| Round 7 – 23 March 2013
|-
|Magnus Carlsen (4½)     || Teimour Radjabov (2½)   ||align=center | ½–½ || B30 Sicilian, Rossolimo
|-
|Levon Aronian (4½)      || Alexander Grischuk (2½) ||align=center | ½–½ || E18 Queen's Indian
|-
|Boris Gelfand (2)        || Vladimir Kramnik (3)     ||align=center | ½–½ || E54 Nimzo-Indian, 4. e3
|-
|Vasyl Ivanchuk (2)     || Peter Svidler (3)        ||align=center | ½–½ || C45 Scotch Game
|}

{| class="wikitable" style="font-size: 95%"
|-
|colspan=4 style="background:#cccccc;" | Round 8 – 24 March 2013
|-
|Magnus Carlsen (5)       || Levon Aronian (5)        ||align=center | ½–½ || E06 Catalan, Closed
|-
|Teimour Radjabov (3)     || Boris Gelfand (2½)      ||align=center | 0–1 || A33 English, Symmetrical
|-
|Alexander Grischuk (3)   || Vasyl Ivanchuk (2½)   ||align=center | 1–0 || B35 Sicilian, Accelerated Dragon
|-
|Vladimir Kramnik (3½)   || Peter Svidler (3½)      ||align=center | 1–0 || D85 Grünfeld, Exchange
|-
|colspan=4 style="background:#cccccc;"| Round 9 – 25 March 2013
|-
|Vladimir Kramnik (4½)   || Magnus Carlsen (5½)     ||align=center | ½–½ || E05 Catalan, Open
|-
|Peter Svidler (3½)      || Alexander Grischuk (4)   ||align=center | ½–½ || E81 King's Indian, Sämisch
|-
|Vasyl Ivanchuk (2½)   || Teimour Radjabov (3)     ||align=center | 1–0 || D57 Queen's Gambit Declined
|-
|Boris Gelfand (3½)      || Levon Aronian (5½)      ||align=center | 1–0 || D37 Queen's Gambit Declined
|-
|colspan=4 style="background:#cccccc;"| Round 10 – 27 March 2013
|-
|Magnus Carlsen (6)       || Boris Gelfand (4½)      ||align=center | 1–0 || B30 Sicilian, Rossolimo
|-
|Levon Aronian (5½)      || Vasyl Ivanchuk (3½)   ||align=center | 1–0 || A52 Budapest Gambit
|-
|Teimour Radjabov (3)     || Peter Svidler (4)        ||align=center | ½–½ || D85 Grünfeld, Exchange
|-
|Alexander Grischuk (4½) || Vladimir Kramnik (5)     ||align=center | 0–1 || C67 Ruy Lopez
|-
|colspan=4 style="background:#cccccc;"| Round 11 – 28 March 2013
|-
|Alexander Grischuk (4½) || Magnus Carlsen (7)       ||align=center | ½–½ || D90 Grünfeld
|-
|Vladimir Kramnik (6)     || Teimour Radjabov (3½)   ||align=center | 1–0 || E60 King's Indian
|-
|Peter Svidler (4½)      || Levon Aronian (6½)      ||align=center | 1–0 || E26 Nimzo-Indian, Sämisch
|-
|Vasyl Ivanchuk (3½)   || Boris Gelfand (4½)      ||align=center | ½–½ || D93 Grünfeld
|-
|colspan=4 style="background:#cccccc;"| Round 12 – 29 March 2013
|-
|Magnus Carlsen (7½)     || Vasyl Ivanchuk (4)     ||align=center | 0–1 || B48 Sicilian, Taimanov
|-
|Boris Gelfand (5)        || Peter Svidler (5½)      ||align=center | ½–½ || D85 Grünfeld, Exchange
|-
|Levon Aronian (6½)      || Vladimir Kramnik (7)     ||align=center | 0–1 || D42 Semi-Tarrasch Defense
|-
|Teimour Radjabov (3½)   || Alexander Grischuk (5)   ||align=center | ½–½ || E35 Nimzo-Indian, Classical
|-
|colspan=4 style="background:#cccccc;"| Round 13 – 31 March 2013
|-
|Teimour Radjabov (4)     || Magnus Carlsen (7½)     ||align=center | 0–1 || E32 Nimzo-Indian, Classical
|-
|Alexander Grischuk (5½) || Levon Aronian (6½)      ||align=center | ½–½ || D11 Slav Accepted
|-
|Vladimir Kramnik (8)     || Boris Gelfand (5½)      ||align=center | ½–½ || D71 Neo-Grünfeld
|-
|Peter Svidler (6)        || Vasyl Ivanchuk (5)     ||align=center | 1–0 || C02 French, Advance Variation
|-
|colspan=4 style="background:#cccccc;"| Round 14 – 1 April 2013
|-
|Magnus Carlsen (8½)     || Peter Svidler (7)        ||align=center | 0–1 || C84 Ruy Lopez, Closed
|-
|Vasyl Ivanchuk (5)     || Vladimir Kramnik (8½)   ||align=center | 1–0 || B08 Pirc Defence, Classical
|-
|Boris Gelfand (6)        || Alexander Grischuk (6)   ||align=center | ½–½ || D85 Grünfeld, Exchange
|-
|Levon Aronian (7)        || Teimour Radjabov (4)     ||align=center | 1–0 || E90 King's Indian
|}

Points by round
For each player, the difference between wins and losses after each round is shown.
The players with the highest difference for each round are marked with green background.

References

2013
2013 in chess
2013 in English sport
2013 in London
Chess in London
International sports competitions in London
March 2013 sports events in the United Kingdom
April 2013 sports events in the United Kingdom